Leroy Percy State Park is a public recreation area located off Mississippi Highway 12 approximately  west of Hollandale, Mississippi. It is the state's oldest state park, its construction having begun with the arrival of the Civilian Conservation Corps in 1934. It is named after LeRoy Percy, a former U.S. Senator from Mississippi.

Activities and amenities
The park features alligators and two observation towers to watch them from, boating and fishing on Alligator Lake, hunting, primitive and developed campsites, eight cabins, two nature trails, picnic area, and a disc golf course.

It features impressive natural beauty in its cypress trees, artesian springs, and ancient oaks with Spanish moss. 

Visitors can pay for a day pass or an overnight campground pass.

References

External links
Leroy Percy State Park Mississippi Department of Wildlife, Fisheries, and Parks
Leroy Percy State Park Map Mississippi Department of Wildlife, Fisheries, and Parks

State parks of Mississippi
Protected areas of Washington County, Mississippi
1934 establishments in Mississippi